Bhimphedi is a Rural municipality located within the Makawanpur District of the Bagmati Province of Nepal.
The rural municipality spans  of area, with a total population of 23,344 according to a 2011 Nepal census.

On March 10, 2017, the Government of Nepal restructured the local level bodies into 753 new local level structures.
The previous Bhimphedi, Bhainse, Nibuwatar, Kogate, Ipa Panchakanya and portion of Namtar VDCs were merged to form Bhimphedi Rural Municipality.
Bhimphedi is divided into 9 wards, with Bhimphedi VDC declared the administrative center of the rural municipality.

Demographics
At the time of the 2011 Nepal census, Bhimphedi Rural Municipality had a population of 24,960. Of these, 55.4% spoke Tamang, 39.8% Nepali, 1.6% Newar, 1.3% Chepang, 0.7% Magar, 0.6% Maithili, 0.2% Bhojpuri, 0.1% Rai, 0.1% Tharu and 0.1% other languages as their first language.

In terms of ethnicity/caste, 58.9% were Tamang, 14.2% Magar, 7.3% Hill Brahmin, 7.0% Chhetri, 3.3% Chepang/Praja, 3.3% Newar, 2.9% Kami, 0.7% Damai/Dholi, 0.4% Rai, 0.3% Gurung, 0.3% Sunuwar, 0.2% Sarki, 0.1% Terai Brahmin, 0.1% Gharti/Bhujel, 0.1% Kathabaniyan, 0.1% Koiri/Kushwaha, 0.1% Musalman, 0.1% Teli, 0.1% Thakuri, 0.1% Tharu, 0.1% Yadav and 0.4% others.

In terms of religion, 51.9% were Buddhist, 43.9% Hindu, 3.4% Christian, 0.2% Prakriti, 0.1% Muslim and 0.4% others.

References

External links
official website of the rural municipality

Rural municipalities in Makwanpur District
Rural municipalities of Nepal established in 2017